Antonio Afonso Moreno (25 August 1943 – 9 June 1975), known as Tonono, was a Spanish footballer who played as a sweeper.

Club career
Born in Arucas, Las Palmas, Gran Canaria, Tonono made his professional debut with hometown's UD Las Palmas, his first competitive appearance coming on 18 February 1962 at Real Murcia. His La Liga bow was made in the 1964–65 season, playing 30 games as the Canary Islands team finished in ninth position; he would only represent one club in his career, being part of the squads that achieved three top-five finishes in the top flight – including a second place in 1969.

Tonono amassed top-tier totals of 313 matches and two goals. He made his last appearance on 31 May 1975 in a Copa del Rey tie against CD Málaga, contracting a viral infection shortly after and dying on 9 June at only 31 years of age in Las Palmas.

International career
Tonono made his debut for Spain on 1 October 1967 in an UEFA Euro 1968 qualifier against Czechoslovakia, a 1–0 loss in Prague in which the Himno de Riego was played before kick-off instead of that of Francoist Spain. He did not appear, however, in any major international tournament, as the national team did not qualify for any during his international spell.

In his 22nd and final cap, on 19 October 1972, Tonono acted as captain in a 2–2 draw with Yugoslavia for the 1974 FIFA World Cup qualifying campaign, in a game played in Las Palmas; he was the first player ever from the region to be selected for the national side.

Honours
Segunda División: 1963–64

See also
List of one-club men

References

External links

 

1943 births
1975 deaths
People from Arucas, Las Palmas
Sportspeople from the Province of Las Palmas
Spanish footballers
Footballers from the Canary Islands
Association football defenders
La Liga players
Segunda División players
UD Las Palmas players
Spain international footballers
Infectious disease deaths in Spain